Mark Bevir (born 1963) is a British philosopher of history. He is a professor of political science and the Director of the Center for British Studies at the University of California, Berkeley, where he currently teaches courses on political theory and philosophy, public policy and organisation, and methodology. He is also a Professor in the  Graduate School of Governance, United Nations University (MERIT) and a Distinguished Research Professor in the College of Arts and Humanities, Swansea University.

Life
Bevir was born in London. His family was broadly humanist and impressed upon Bevir the importance of reading, self-expression and seeking personal growth. Bevir was educated at the University of Exeter and Oxford University. He lectured at the University of Madras and at Newcastle University before he moved to Berkeley. He has been a visiting fellow at universities in Australia, Finland, France, the UK, and the US.

Work
Bevir has published extensively in philosophy, history, and political science literatures.  His interests are diverse, including Anglophone, continental, and South Asian thought, particularly radical, socialist, and critical theory of the nineteenth and twentieth centuries.  Philosophical concerns include postanalytic approaches to subjectivity, social inquiry, ethics, and democratic theory.

Philosophy of history
Bevir is the author of The Logic of the History of Ideas (1999), which builds on the work of analytic philosophers such as Ludwig Wittgenstein and Donald Davidson to "undertake a normative study of the forms of reasoning appropriate to the history of ideas".  His approach is intended to complement, and not directly oppose, the Cambridge School of history of political thought which focuses on recovering meanings of historical texts, and hermeneutic theorists concerned with the phenomenology of understanding.  Rather, Bevir introduces the idea of a normative approach that hinges on using traditions and dilemmas to understand beliefs and more complex webs of meaning, key concepts that underpin his work on interpretive political science and governance theory.

Interpretivism
Mark Bevir and R. A. W. Rhodes are the authors of Interpreting British Governance (2003), Governance Stories (2006), and The State as Cultural Practice (2010).  They argue that political science must necessarily be an interpretive art.  This is because they hold that the starting point of enquiry must be to unpack the meanings, beliefs, and preferences of actors to then make sense of understanding actions, practices, and institutions.  Political science is therefore an interpretative discipline underpinned by hermeneutic philosophy rather than positivism: there is no ‘science’ of politics, instead all explanations, including those that deploy statistics and models, are best conceived as narratives.  Bevir and Rhodes thus provide an elaborate philosophical foundation for a decentred theory of governance woven together by the notions of beliefs, traditions and dilemmas. 'It follows that the role of political scientists is to use (1) ethnography to uncover people's beliefs and preferences, and (2) history to uncover traditions as they develop in response to dilemmas.  The product is a story of other people's constructions of what they are doing, which provides actors’ views on changes in government, the economy, and society.  So, for example, a political scientist may select a part of the governance process, and then explain it by unpicking various political traditions and how actors within these traditions encounter and act to resolve dilemmas.  Governance is thus understood as the contingent and unintended outcome of competing narratives of governance.'

Governance
Bevir first published his decentred theory of governance in a 2003 paper. Later he published a book length version that applied the theory to both different organizational types and the changing nature of public action. In his collaborations with Rhodes, Bevir applied the theory mainly to Britain.

The theory draws on Bevir's earlier work on the philosophy of history to develop a particular account of the state and of political action. It suggests that the modern state is dispersed, lacking an essence or center. It suggests that political action embodies the meanings and beliefs that people reach as they draw on inherited traditions to respond to new dilemmas.

In her short account, Claire Donovan explains that "For Bevir and Rhodes, decentered theory revolves around the idea of situated agency: institutions, practices or socialisation cannot determine how people behave, so any course of action is a contingent individual choice. People’s actions are explained by their beliefs (or meanings or desires); any one belief is interpreted in the context of the wider web of a person’s beliefs; and these beliefs are explained by traditions and modified by dilemmas. A tradition (or episteme or paradigm) is the set of theories against the background of which a person comes to hold beliefs and perform actions. It is a first influence upon people – a set of beliefs that they inherit and then transform in response to encounters with "dilemmas" (or problems or anomalies).  A dilemma arises whenever novel circumstances generate a new belief that forces people to question their previously held beliefs.  Change occurs through encountering such dilemmas: while individual responses to dilemmas are grounded in traditions, they then modify just those traditions."

Bevir argues that decentred theory supports democratic participation and pluralism. Post-Marxists like Aletta Norval have also adopted decentred theory, arguing it supports democratic learning and agonistic politics.

Intellectual history
Bevir wrote his Ph.D. thesis at the University of Oxford on the history of British socialism. He published a number of articles on the topic and then The Making of British Socialism (2011). Bevir rejects accounts of socialism that emphasise class consciousness. He argues that British socialism arose as people revised various traditions in response to economic and religious dilemmas. Socialism has diverse strands rooted in distinct traditions including Tory radicalism, romanticism, liberalism, and positivism. Bevir's emphasis on the diversity of socialism is meant to correct the twentieth century association of socialism with the labour movement and with state intervention. He suggests that earlier socialists focused on social justice, radical democratic schemes, and utopian personal and social transformations.

Selected bibliography

Books

Edited books

Special journal issues

Reference works

Journal articles

References

External links
 Berkeley Faculty Biography – Mark Bevir
 Online videos of Bevir giving lectures:
"The Idea of a National History"
"Philosophy and the History of Ideas" –  In four sessions by Fathom / Cambridge University Press
 Mark Bevir investigates the effect of  Michel Foucault's The Order of Things in the context of political theory
 Intellectual History Review's theme issue on Bevir.
 "How Social Science Creates the World – A Conversation with Mark Bevir", Ideas Roadshow, 2016

1963 births
Living people
Philosophers of history
English political philosophers
20th-century British philosophers
21st-century British philosophers
Intellectual historians
English historians
British political scientists
English socialists
University of California, Berkeley College of Letters and Science faculty
People educated at Ardingly College
Alumni of the University of Exeter
Bevir,Mark